Same-sex intimacy is a relationship between two friends of the same sex that has many components of a sexually intimate relationship (e.g. self-disclosures, emotional expressiveness, unconditional support, physical contact and trust), but not necessarily sexual intimacy or sexual contact.  The term can apply to the exploration of sexuality outside the home, as well as to the physical activities shared between two friends.

See also
 Cross-sex friendship

References

Friendship